Teiji (written: 貞治, 貞司, 貞二, 悌二 or 悌次) is a masculine Japanese given name. Notable people with the name include:

, Japanese ice hockey player
, Japanese composer
, Japanese voice actor and actor
, Japanese mathematician
, Japanese actor

Japanese masculine given names